Ya Hey may refer to:

 "Ya Hey" (song), by Vampire Weekend
 Ya Hey (album), by Emrah